Ernesto Alejandro Brown (7 January 1885 – 12 July 1935) was an Argentine international footballer who played as a left back. He was nicknamed El Pacifico ("the Calm One") for his assured performances for both club and country.

Early life
Brown was an Argentine of Scottish origin.

Brown had four brothers who were also Argentine international players – Alfredo, Carlos, Eliseo and Jorge – as well as one cousin, Juan Domingo. Two other brothers – Diego and Tomás – were also footballers.

Career
Brown played club football for Alumni, and international football for the Argentina national team. He made 12 official appearances for Argentina between 1902 and 1912, scoring one goal.

References

1885 births
1935 deaths
Argentine footballers
Argentina international footballers
Argentine people of Scottish descent
Alumni Athletic Club players
Association football fullbacks
Brown family (Argentina)